James B. Clark (October 14, 1867 – May 14, 1943) was an Ontario farmer and political figure. He represented Kent East from 1919 to January 1920 as a United Farmers of Ontario member.

He was born in Harwich Township, Ontario, the son of William B. Clark. In 1889, he married Maria C. Scarlett. He was a member of the township council and served as reeve from 1909 to 1910. Clark also served as a member of the council for Kent County. He died in Chatham in 1943 and was buried at Evergreen Cemetery at Blenheim.

References 

 Canadian Parliamentary Guide, 1920, EJ Chambers

External links 

1867 births
1943 deaths
United Farmers of Ontario MLAs
Canadian Methodists
People from Chatham-Kent